Bignay National High School is a public general high school in Valenzuela City, Philippines. It is located at Gitna St., Brgy. Bignay, Valenzuela City.

History 
With the DepEd and former President Gloria Macapagal Arroyo’s initiative to have a school in every barangay, the principal of Bignay Elementary School spearheaded the establishment of a secondary school for Barangay Bignay in 2003. In consultation with the previous schools division superintendent, the new high school became an annex of Valenzuela National High School.

The Valenzuela National High School – Bignay Annex began its first year of operation in 2004. The opening of the school was realized through the efforts of the barangay officials and the Bignay Elementary School Principal Mr. Eduardo Q. Lita. The school was funded by the City Government of Valenzuela through then-Mayor Jose Emmanuel L. Carlos. Its initial enrolment was 67 (Bridge Program) and 154 1st year (regular) students; and 221 2nd year and 3rd year students. There were five high school teachers during that time. Dr. Vicente Tablate was designated as Teacher-In Charge and the school was located in the vicinity of Bignay Elementary School.

In its second year of operation (SY 2005–2006), the high school was separated from the elementary with Mrs. Lagrimas Bayle as its Officer-in-Charge from May to August 2005. The enrollment ballooned to 885 students because of the relocation of the families along the railways of Caruhatan, Malinta, Dalandanan, and Malanday due to the government's Northrail Project. The number of teachers had increased from 5 to 14. Mr. Cesar C. Villareal took office as Officer-In-Charge from August 2005 to March 2006.

In June 2006, Ms. Grace L. Pascua was assigned as the new OIC. During her term, the number of teachers have increased by 6 and by the start of SY 2007–2008, Bignay High School had 24 teachers. In 2008, the enrollment increased to 1127 with 10 academic classrooms and 29 teachers.

At present, Bignay National High School is located at Gitna, Bignay Valenzuela City with its 7,733 sq.m. lot area. This was realized by virtue of Resolution No. 004, S. 2007, passed by the City Government, allowing the purchase of the lot for the school. Through the leadership of former Mayor Win Gatchalian, the 17-classroom building was built. For its facilities, the City Government also provided the school with 50 computer units, a spacious activity center, and a new canteen. Through the years, two additional buildings were built inside the vicinity of the campus to cater the growing population of Bignay and its neighboring barangays.

On July 17, 2009, former President Gloria Macapagal Arroyo signed the Republic Act 9660, converting VNHS-Bignay Annex into an independent national high school to be known as Bignay National High School.

Bignay National High School is one of the first public high schools in Valenzuela that offered Senior High School starting S.Y. 2016–2017.  In December 2016, Bignay NHS had its first annex campus located at Disciplina Village - Bignay, which was named Bignay National High School - Disciplina Village Annex. On July 3, 2018, Mrs. Ma. Christina C. Salonga, the former principal of Valenzuela City School of Mathematics and Science, became its new principal. On August 23, 2018, BNHS-Disciplina Village Annex became an independent national high school as Disciplina Village - Bignay National High School as per Republic Act 11074.

List of School Heads

Curriculum 

Junior High School

Grade 7 to 10

Senior High School

Grade 11 and 12

References

External links

Valenzuela City Website
Division Of City Schools-Valenzuela

Schools in Valenzuela, Metro Manila
High schools in Metro Manila
Public schools in Metro Manila
Educational institutions established in 2004
2004 establishments in the Philippines